6709 Hiromiyuki, provisional designation , is a background or Florian asteroid from the inner regions of the asteroid belt, approximately  in diameter. It was discovered on 2 February 1989, by Japanese amateur astronomers Masaru Arai and Hiroshi Mori at the Yorii Observatory in Japan. The possibly elongated S-type asteroid has a rotation period of 6.8 hours. It was named after the Hiroshi Mori's children, Hiroyuki and Miyuki.

Orbit and classification 

Hiromiyuki is a non-family asteroid of the main belt's background population when applying the hierarchical clustering method to its proper orbital elements. Based on osculating Keplerian orbital elements, the asteroid has also been classified as a member of the Flora family, a giant asteroid family and the largest family of stony asteroids in the main-belt.

Hiromiyuki orbits the Sun in the inner asteroid belt at a distance of 2.0–2.7 AU once every 3 years and 7 months (1,315 days; semi-major axis of 2.35 AU). Its orbit has an eccentricity of 0.16 and an inclination of 2° with respect to the ecliptic.

Physical characteristics 

Hiromiyuki is an assumed S-type asteroid based on its classification into the Flora family.

Rotation period 

In February 2007, a rotational lightcurve of Hiromiyuki was obtained from photometric observations by Donald P. Pray at Carbuncle Hill Observatory , in collaboration with Adrián Galád, Marek Husárik, and Julian Oey. Lightcurve analysis gave a rotation period of 6.828 hours with an exceptionally high brightness amplitude of  magnitude, which typically indicates that the body has an elongated shape.

Diameter and albedo 

According to the survey carried out by the NEOWISE mission of NASA's Wide-field Infrared Survey Explorer, Hiromiyuki measures 3.98 kilometers in diameter and its surface has a high albedo of 0.34. The Collaborative Asteroid Lightcurve Link assumes an albedo of 0.24 – derived from 8 Flora, the parent body of the Flora family – and calculates a diameter of 4.50 kilometers based on an absolute magnitude of 13.9.

Naming 

This minor planet was named after Hiroyuki (born 1991) and Miyuki Mori (born 1993), son and daughter of the second co-discoverer Hiroshi Mori. The official naming citation was published by the Minor Planet Center on 6 March 2004.

References

External links 
 Asteroid Lightcurve Database (LCDB), query form (info )
 Dictionary of Minor Planet Names, Google books
 Discovery Circumstances: Numbered Minor Planets (5001)-(10000) – Minor Planet Center
 
 

006709
Discoveries by Masaru Arai
Discoveries by Hiroshi Mori (astronomer)
Named minor planets
19890202